Dargah of Shah Ata is a historical building situated in Bangarh, Gangarampur, West Bengal, India. It is adjacent to Dhaldighi Lake. The building was probably constructed in the 14th century, on the site of a temple dating to the Pala Empire (8th to 12th century). The building is a brick and stone mausoleum, the burial site of Mollah Atar-Uddin or Shah Ata.

References

Gangarampur
Medieval Bengal
Islam in India
Dargahs
Dargahs in India